= City Friends Club =

- Abbreviation: CFC
- Formation: 2020
- Founder: Anna Gubareva, Alexey Gubarev
- Type: Conservation organization
- Region served: Cyprus
- Website: cityfriends.club

City Friends Club (CFC) is a non-profit environmental organisation based in Limassol, Cyprus. Founded in 2020, the organisation carries out daily street cleanings, broader environmental clean-up initiatives, volunteer programmes, and public awareness projects promoting environmental protection and sustainable urban environments. It was officially registered as a non-governmental organisation on 6 May 2022.

== History ==
City Friends Club was founded in Limassol in 2020 by Anna Gubareva, with support from her husband, Alexey Gubarev, following concerns about litter and waste pollution in public spaces during the COVID-19 pandemic.

The initiative was initially supported through private funding provided by the founders before being registered as a non-governmental organisation in 2022.

The organisation subsequently expanded its activities beyond Limassol. In October 2024, it opened an office in Larnaca in cooperation with the Municipality of Larnaca to coordinate volunteer programmes and environmental initiatives in the city.

In December 2024, City Friends Club opened its first office in Paphos. The office coordinates local volunteer activities and environmental projects and cooperates with Lumio Private School on environmental education initiatives.

== Activities ==
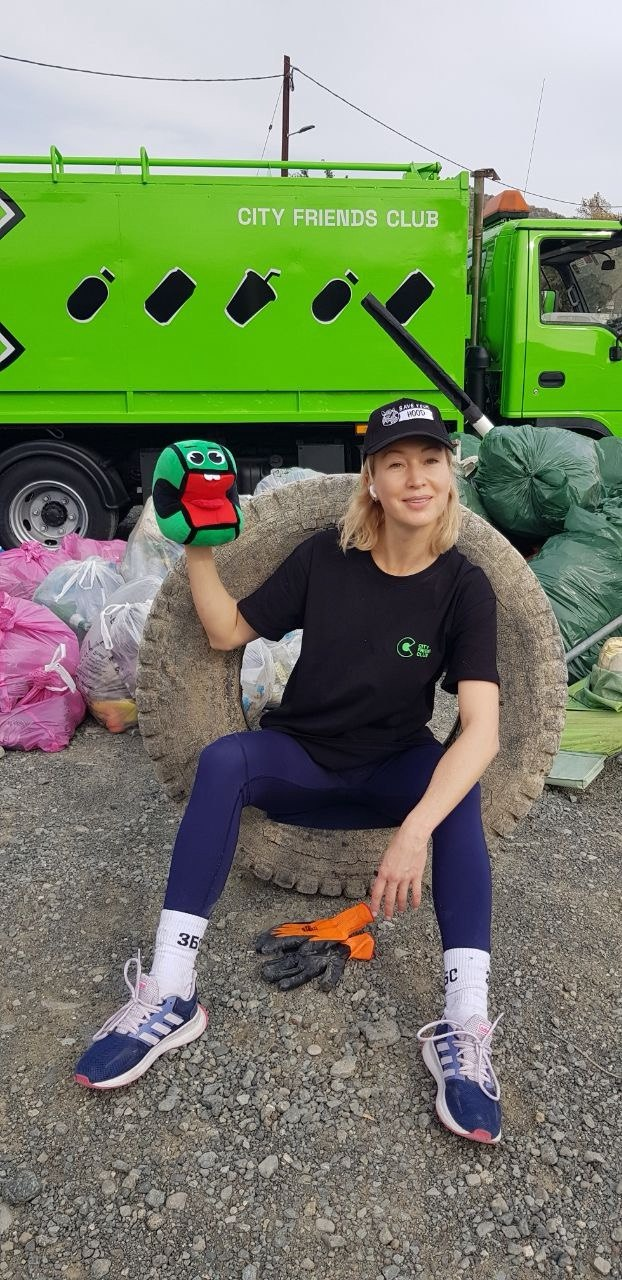
City Friends Club founder Anna Gubareva at one of the cleanup events

City Friends Club organises daily cleanings by professional street cleaners and supports environmental initiatives aimed at improving public spaces and promoting responsible waste management.

Its activities include organised community clean-up events, environmental education projects, public lectures and workshops, as well as collaborations with local authorities, schools and private organisations on environmental initiatives.

The organisation has also participated in projects intended to encourage public engagement with environmental issues through education, community participation and creative initiatives.

== Environmental art projects ==
In 2023, City Friends Club collaborated with ARTNOW to organise RE:SOURCE, an environmental art exhibition in Limassol presenting works created from recycled and reused materials. The exhibition included educational events, workshops and public discussions on sustainability and waste reduction.

Later that year, the organisation co-organised Revive Festival in Limassol with Zograff Studio. The festival combined street art with environmental awareness activities, including murals, workshops, lectures, guided tours and volunteer events focused on sustainability.

City Friends Club also partnered with ARTNOW to organise NYX5R, an environmental art exhibition exploring environmental issues through artworks created from recycled materials.

== Recognition ==
On 30 March 2023, the Limassol Municipal Council awarded City Friends Club and its founder, Anna Gubareva, the Lion of Ancient Amathus, the official emblem of the city, in recognition of their contribution to improving urban cleanliness and environmental awareness in Limassol. Later that year, City Friends Club received the Impact Driver Award at the inaugural TechIsland Awards for its contribution to addressing social and environmental challenges in Cyprus. The same year, the organisation's founder, Anna Gubareva, was also awarded the Red Diamond Award in recognition of her work with City Friends Club and her contribution to the local community.
